Jean-Frédéric Perregaux (1744–1808) was a banker from Neuchâtel (now in Switzerland).

1744 births
1808 deaths
Burials at the Panthéon, Paris
Members of the Sénat conservateur
People from Neuchâtel
People from the canton of Neuchâtel
People of the French Revolution
Bankers
Regents of the Banque de France
People from the Kingdom of Prussia